Yannic Voigt (born 27 October 2002) is a German professional footballer who plays as a midfielder for  club FSV Zwickau.

Career
After playing youth football for Erzgebirge Aue and VfB Auerbach, Voigt started his senior career at Auerbach, making 11 appearances and scoring three goals during the 2020–21 season. On 14 June 2021, he signed for 3. Liga club FSV Zwickau on a two-year contract.

References

External links

2002 births
Living people
German footballers
Association football midfielders
FC Erzgebirge Aue players
VfB Auerbach players
FSV Zwickau players
3. Liga players
Regionalliga players